Rogier may refer to:

Given name

Rogier is a Dutch masculine given name equivalent to Roger. People with this name include:
Rogier van Aerde, pseudonym of Adolf Josef Hubert Frans van Rijen (1917–2007), Dutch writer and journalist
Rogier Blink (born 1982), Dutch rower
Rogier Blokland (born 1971), Dutch linguist and Professor of Finno-Ugric languages at Uppsala University
 (born 1974), Dutch composer and arranger
Rogier van der Heide (born 1970), designer born in the Netherlands who currently lives in Liechtenstein
Rogier Hofman (born 1986), Dutch field hockey player
Rogier Jansen (born 1984), Dutch basketball player
Rogier Koordes (born 1972), Dutch former footballer
Rogier Krohne (born 1986), Dutch footballer
Rogier Meijer (born 1981), Dutch former footballer
Rogier Michael (c. 1553 – 1623), Dutch-born German composer and Kapellmeister
Rogier Molhoek (born 1981), former Dutch footballer
Rogier van Otterloo (1941–1988), Dutch composer and conductor
Rogier Stoffers (born 1961), Dutch cinematographer
Rogier Telderman (born 1982), Dutch jazz pianist
Rogier Veenstra (born 1987), Dutch footballer
Rogier Verbeek (1845–1926), Dutch geologist and natural scientist
Rogier Wassen (born 1976), Dutch tennis player
Rogier van der Weyden (1399–1464), Early Netherlandish painter
Rogier Windhorst (born 1954), astronomer and a professor of physics and astronomy at Arizona State University

Surname

Charles Rogier (1800–1885), Belgian liberal statesman, a leader in the Belgian Revolution of 1830
Peire Rogier (born 1145), an Occitan Auvergnat troubadour and cathedral canon from Clermont
Philippe Rogier (1561–1596), Flemish composer active at the Habsburg court of Philip II in Spain

Places

Rogier metro station, Brussels metro station on the northern segment of line 2
Rogier Tower, skyscraper in Saint-Josse-ten-Noode, Brussels, Belgium

See also
Roger
Rogiera
Rougier
Rutger



Dutch masculine given names